Terry is an unincorporated community in Leopold Township, Perry County, in the U.S. state of Indiana.

History
A post office was established at Terry in 1892, and remained in operation until it was discontinued in 1943. According to Ronald L. Baker, the name probably honors a local family of settlers.

Geography

References

Unincorporated communities in Perry County, Indiana
Unincorporated communities in Indiana